"Make That Cake" is a song by American rapper LunchMoney Lewis, released on June 28, 2019 through Lunchbox Records. There are two versions of the song, one solo and another featuring fellow American rapper Doja Cat. There were accompanying music videos for both versions of the song.

Background and promotion 
The original version of the song was premiered on June 28, 2019, three months before the remix was released as a single. A music video for the original version was uploaded via Lewis' YouTube account on July 15, 2019. On September 6, 2019, Lewis uploaded the music video for the remix featuring Doja Cat on his YouTube account. The video for the song  was released simultaneously and was directed by Chris Moreno.

Critical reception 
Writing for The Fader, Sajae Elder praised both Lewis and Doja Cat's rapping, describing it as "laidback flows" and also described the song as a "bouncy track". Milca P. of the website HotNewHipHop wroteː "On the cut, Lewis and Doja match off on similar flows as the track arrives attached to an equally eclectic clip directed by Chris Moreno." Rj Frometa of Vents described the song as "a glitchy hip-hop beat backed by stirring vocals", addingː "With lyrics developed using clever word play, Lunch has created an entertaining track that belongs on every summer playlist. AllHipHop added to their blog, "LunchMoney Lewis returns with Doja Cat and all that cake".

Track listing

Release history

References

External links
 
 

2019 songs
2019 singles
LunchMoney Lewis songs
Doja Cat songs
Songs written by LunchMoney Lewis
Songs written by Doja Cat
Kemosabe Records singles
Columbia Records singles
Media about cakes